Godin may refer to:

Places 
 Godin, Doulougou, a village in the Doulougou Department of Kouritenga Province in Burkina Faso
 Godin (Gounghin), a village in the Gounghin Department of Kouritenga Province in Burkina Faso
 Godin, Bissiga, a village in the Bissiga Department of Kouritenga Province in Burkina Faso
 Godin (settlement), a settlement in Les Awirs, Flémalle, province of Liège, Belgium
 Godin (crater), a lunar impact crater named after Louis Godin

Other
 Godin (surname), a list of people with the surname
 Godin (guitar manufacturer), a Canadian guitar manufacturing company

See also

 Gaudin (disambiguation)
 Goding (disambiguation)